Canoas Air Force Base – ALA3  is a base of the Brazilian Air Force, located in Canoas, near Porto Alegre, Brazil.

History
The history of Canoas Air Force Base begins in 1937, when the 3rd Army Aviation Regiment (3º RAv) was transferred from Santa Maria Air Force Base to Canoas. With the creation of the Air Force Ministry in 1941, the 3º RAv became known as Gravataí Air Force Base. On 21 August 1944, the 3º RAv officially ceased to exist and on the same day Canoas Air Force Base was commissioned.

Units
The following units are based at Canoas Air Force Base:
 1st Squadron of the 14th Aviation Group (1º/14ºGAv) Pampa, using the F-5EM & FM.
 5th Squadron of Air Transportation (5°ETA) Pégaso, using the C-95BM & CM Bandeirante, C-97 Brasília and C-98A Caravan.
 2nd Squadron of the 7th Aviation Group (2º/7ºGAv) Phoenix, using the P-95BM Bandeirulha.
 2nd Squadron of the 1st Communications and Control Group (2º/1ºGCC) Aranha, using radars and equipment for air defense.

Accidents and incidents
28 July 1950: a Panair do Brasil Lockheed L-049 Constellation registration PP-PCG operating flight 099 from Rio de Janeiro-Galeão to Canoas Air Force Base struck power lines and crashed on a hill after an aborted landing and while holding in bad weather near São Leopoldo. All 50 passengers and crew died. At the time of the accident, the runway at São João Airport (presently Salgado Filho) was not yet paved, therefore the Constellations used the Air Base runway

Access
The base is located 6 km east of downtown Canoas and 21 km north of downtown Porto Alegre.

Gallery
This gallery displays aircraft that are or have been based at Canoas. The gallery is not comprehensive.

Present aircraft

Retired aircraft

See also
List of Brazilian military bases

References

External links

Rio Grande do Sul
Brazilian Air Force
Brazilian Air Force bases
Buildings and structures in Rio Grande do Sul
Canoas
Porto Alegre
Airfields of the United States Army Air Forces Air Transport Command in South America
1937 establishments in Brazil